Alexander Matthews is an American playwright and philosopher.

Matthews was born in New York City. He taught Philosophy in a number of universities between 1975 and 1989 and in 1986 was awarded a Visiting Fellowship to Princeton University.

He has published two books - A Diagram of Definition, in 1997, and Lazarus Revived, 2019. Other writings include three full-length dramatic poems: The Chairman (1966), Mr Swettham (1969) and Current Affairs (1971).

Matthews has also written four plays that have been produced in London's West End - My One True Friend, Do You Love This Planet?, Screaming Secrets and Glass Roots.

His published essays include: Philosophy and Human Rights (International Journal of Human Rights - 1997), How Some Scientists Erode The Human Rights We Value (ibid. 2000), and The Universe Has No Beginning? Doubts About The Big Bang Theory (Physics Essays 2005).

Matthews is also the chair of the Martha Gellhorn Trust Prize Committee, which offers a prize for journalism annually. He also chaired the NSubF Committee that advises the UK government on the disposal of nuclear waste from submarines.

References

American male dramatists and playwrights
American dramatists and playwrights
Year of birth missing (living people)
Living people